Alloeodidicrum is a genus of drain flies in the subfamily Psychodinae. It consists of two species.

Species
Alloeodidicrum eungellae Duckhouse, 1990, the type species.
Alloeodidicrum confusa (Satchell, 1953)

References

Psychodidae
Psychodomorpha genera
Diptera of Australasia